The County of Gripsholm, or Gripsholms län, was a county of the Swedish Empire from 1634 to 1683. It was one of three counties in the province of Södermanland, and in 1683 they were merged into the County of Södermanland.

See also
County of Nyköping
County of Eskilstunahus

Former counties of Sweden
1634 establishments in Sweden